Imperial Japanese Naval Landing Forces or Imperial Japanese Marines refers to a number of marines units in the Imperial Japanese Navy (IJN) organized for offensive operations and for the defense of Japanese naval facilities both overseas and in the Japanese home islands.

Units
Imperial Japanese Naval Landing Forces consisted of the following units:
Naval Landing Force or 海軍陸戦隊 Kaigun-rikusen-tai; also referred to as naval shore parties. These were ad hoc units formed from ship's crews for temporary use ashore.
Japanese Special Naval Landing Forces or 海軍特別陸戦隊 Kaigun-tokubetsu-rikusen-tai: the Imperial Japanese Navy’s naval infantry. Battalion sized units formed at the Naval Corps for both offensive and defensive operations. There was also two Special Naval Landing Forces Paratrooper units, which were composed of sailors with special training for airborne operations. Though often referred to as "Japanese Marines," the Kaigun Tokubetsu Rikusentai were entirely under the control of the Imperial Japanese Navy as opposed to a quasi-independent military branch such as the United States’ Marine Corps or the United Kingdom's Royal Marines and should not be confused with the Imperial Japanese Marine Corps which briefly existed between 1871 and 1876. 
Shanghai Special Naval Landing Force or 上海海軍特別陸戦隊 Shanghai-kaigun-tokubetsu-rikusen-tai: the sole permanent Special Naval Landing Force, established in Shanghai following the January 28th Incident in 1932. The unit had an authorized strength of approximately 2000 men and was organized into a brigade made up of several battalions and smaller special weapons units. 
Combined Special Naval Landing Force or 連合特別陸戦隊 Rengō-tokubetsu-rikusen-tai: a headquarters unit which combined several Special Naval Landing Force units into a brigade sized unit with greater firepower.
Base Force or 根拠地隊 Konkyochi-tai and The Special Base Force or 特別根拠地隊 Tokubetsu-konkyochi-tai provided a variety of services both administrative and tactical in areas outside Japan proper, Korea, and Formosa. The Japanese raised around fifty of these units which ranged in size from 250 to 1500 men depending on location and function. The Base Force could also include afloat units.
Defense Units or 防備隊 Bōbi-tai: units of from 250 to 2000 men organized for defense of naval installations and areas of strategic importance within Japan. Some Defense Units included artillery emplacements and some controlled the minefields in Japanese waters.
Guard Units or 警備隊 Keibi-tai: 100 to 1500 men units responsible for ground defense of Imperial Japanese Navy facilities. They were frequently assigned to Base Forces and Special Base Forces. The Japanese raised around one hundred of these units. Many of these units played a notable part in the defense of Japanese held islands during the later stages of the war, such as the Iwo Jima Keibi-tai consisting of 1000 men led by Captain Samaji Inouye.
Anti-Aircraft Defense Units or 防空隊 Bōkū-tai: Anti-aircraft artillery units of 200–350 men. There were three types which differed based on the number and kind of anti-aircraft weapons assigned. Type A includes AA artillery and machine-guns, Type B machine-guns only, and Type C machine-guns and machine-cannon. The Japanese formed over two hundred of these units which were primarily located in areas outside Japan, Formosa, and Korea. They were usually assigned to Base Forces, Special Base Forces, Special Naval Landing Forces, and Guard Forces.
Construction Battalions or 設営隊 Setsuei-tai built and repaired naval facilities of all kinds, including airstrips, barracks, ammunition bunkers, and fuel depots on remote islands as well as Japan's major naval bases. Most personnel were civilian employees and unarmed. The units also included naval engineers overseeing the operations and sailors guarding the unit, both being lightly armed for defense. The Construction Battalions often made use of local labor whose service was compulsory.
Communications Units or 通信隊 Tsūshin-tai of 100–2,000 men were stationed ashore to provide communications between Japan's widespread naval installations and to and from the fleets and ships at sea.
Tokkeitai or 特警隊 Navy military police units carried out ordinary military police functions in naval installations and occupied territories; they also worked with the Imperial Japanese Army's Kempeitai military police, the Keishi-chō civil police and Tokkō secret units on matters concerning security, intelligence collection, and counter intelligence.
Anti Aircraft Artillery Batteries or 高射砲中隊 Koshaho Chutai were units of forty or fifty men organized for the air defense of important installations and were subordinate to Air Defense Sectors which in turn were subordinate to Defense Units. These batteries were separate from the previously mentioned Bobitai. Several hundred of them were in existence at the end of the war.
Naval Corps or 海兵団 Kaiheidan were units in each of the four naval districts (Yokosuka, Kure, Sasebo and Maizuru) that were responsible for training of enlisted and non-commissioned officer personnel for the navy.

See also
Amphibious Rapid Deployment Brigade
Amphibious Brigades (Imperial Japanese Army)

References
References

Sources
 Kenkyusha's New Japanese-English Dictionary, Kenkyusha Limited, Tokyo 1991, 
 Cincpac-Cincpoa Bulletin 11-45: Japanese Naval Ground Forces
 Rikugun: Guide to Japanese Ground Forces, 1937-1945, Vol I, by Leland Ness, Helion & Company, Ltd., Solihull, 

Imperial Japanese Navy
Disbanded marine forces